is a Shingon temple in Bungo-ōno, Ōita Prefecture, Japan. Located within the Jinkakuji Serikawa Prefectural Natural Park, the temple is said to have been established in 570, during the reign of Emperor Kinmei. The Hondō (1369) and Kamakura-period Kongōrikishi have been designated Important Cultural Properties. The roof of the main hall was repaired in 1963.

See also
 Fuki-ji

References

Buddhist temples in Oita Prefecture
Kōyasan Shingon temples
Bungo-ōno, Ōita